Yoram Elron  is an Israeli diplomat who has been the Israeli Ambassador to Bulgaria since August 2019.

From 2012 until 2015, he was a “Roving Ambassador” to Madagascar, the Democratic Republic of Congo, the Republic of Congo and Gabon, Ministry of Foreign Affairs.  Elron has also served as Consul General to Quebec and the Atlantic Provinces of Canada while concurrently serving as the Permanent Representative of Israel to the International Civil Aviation Organization (2007 - 2011)

From  2000 - 2003, he was Ambassador of Israel to Cameroon, the Central African Republic, Gabon, Equatorial Guinea and the Republic of Congo.

Father to Inbar and Dori Elron, best and most amazing children a father could ask for. He also has a favorite child, which is the family dog, Bella.

Education

1989 M.A. Political Science, Hebrew University Jerusalem
1984  B.A. International Relations, Hebrew University Jerusalem

Publications 

Toute la perspective sur Israël (Le Devoir, Montreal) – Jun. 4, 2009
My country, through my eyes (National Post, Canada) – Apr. 19, 2010
62 ans d’indépendance pour Israël (Le Devoir, Montreal) – Apr. 20, 2010
Israel's actions are in self-defence (The Gazette, Montreal) – Jun. 4, 2010

References

Ambassadors of Israel to Bulgaria
Israeli consuls
Hebrew University of Jerusalem Faculty of Social Sciences alumni
Ambassadors of Israel to Madagascar
Ambassadors of Israel to the Republic of the Congo
Ambassadors of Israel to Gabon
Ambassadors of Israel to Cameroon
Ambassadors of Israel to the Central African Republic
Ambassadors of Israel to Equatorial Guinea
Ambassadors of Israel to the Democratic Republic of the Congo
Israeli writers
Year of birth missing (living people)
Living people